Howards End is a British-American television drama based on the 1910 novel of the same name by E. M. Forster. The series was adapted by Kenneth Lonergan, directed by Hettie MacDonald, and stars Hayley Atwell. The four-part series is a co-production between British network BBC One and American network Starz. It premiered on 12 November 2017 in the United Kingdom and 8 April 2018 in the United States.

Premise
Howards End examines "the changing landscape of social and class divisions in turn-of-the-century England through the prism of three families: the intellectual and idealistic Schlegels, the wealthy Wilcoxes from the world of business and the working-class Basts."

Cast and characters

Main

 Hayley Atwell as Margaret Schlegel
 Matthew Macfadyen as Henry Wilcox
 Philippa Coulthard as Helen Schlegel
 Joseph Quinn as Leonard Bast
 Joe Bannister as Charles Wilcox 
 Rosalind Eleazar as Jacky Bast
 Alex Lawther as Tibby Schlegel
 Bessie Carter as Evie Wilcox
 Jonah Hauer-King as Paul Wilcox 
 Tracey Ullman as Aunt Juley Mund
 Julia Ormond as Ruth Wilcox

Recurring

 Donna Banya as Annie
 Yolanda Kettle as Dolly Wilcox
 Sandra Voe as Miss Avery
 Gavin Brocker as Crane
 Miles Jupp as Percy Cahill
 William Belchambers as Burton
 Hannah Traylen as Nancy

Guest
 Leonie Benesch as Frieda Mosenbach

Episodes

Production

Development
On 28 November 2012 it was announced that Playground Entertainment, in association with City Entertainment and KippSter Entertainment, had acquired the screen rights to E.M. Forster's novel Howards End with the intention of adapting it into a television drama for BBC Two. Executive producers for the production were set to include Colin Callender, Joshua D. Maurer, Alixandre Witlin, and David A. Stern. On 11 October 2013 it was announced that Kenneth Lonergan had been chosen to adapt the novel. The production had yet to be greenlit by the BBC but it was reportedly expected to consist of four episodes. It was additionally announced that Polly Hill would be executive producing for the BBC. On 28 December 2015 it was announced that BBC One had officially greenlit the production. On 7 June 2016 it was announced that Hettie MacDonald would direct all four episodes of the serial. On 15 February 2017 it was announced that Starz was joining the production as a co-producer.

Casting
Alongside the announcement that Starz was joining the production, it was confirmed that Hayley Atwell, Matthew Macfadyen, and Tracey Ullman would star in the series. A few days later, it was announced that Julia Ormond, Philippa Coulthard, Joseph Quinn, Rosalind Eleazar, and Alex Lawther had also joined the main cast.

Filming
Principal photography for the drama began during the summer of 2016. The house used for Howards End is Vann House, near Hambledon; dating from 1542 but remodelled by WD Caröe after 1907 with gardens designed by Gertrude Jekyll. Scenes were filmed at Waverley Abbey, West Wycombe Park, Ballard Down, Swanage Pier and Harry Warren House on Studland Bay. London locations included Myddelton Square in Clerkenwell, Great Russell Street, Chancery Lane, the British Museum, Australia House and Simpsons in the Strand.

Release

Marketing
On 4 May 2017 the first image from the series was released. On 7 December 2017 Starz released the first trailer for American audiences.

Premiere
On 1 November 2017 the series held its official British premiere in London at the BFI Southbank. On 4 April 2018 the series held its official American premiere in New York City at the Whitby Hotel.

Broadcast
Howards End is broadcast on BBC One in the United Kingdom, ABC TV in Australia and Starz in the United States. The series premiered in the United States on 8 April 2018 on Starz.

Reception

Critical response
The series was met with a positive response from critics. On the review aggregation website Rotten Tomatoes, the series holds an 88% approval rating with an average rating of 7.73 out of 10 based on 34 reviews. The website's critical consensus reads, "Hayley Atwell shines in Howards End, a beautiful, if borderline superficial, adaptation of a much-revered book." Metacritic, which uses a weighted average, assigned the season a score of 86 out of 100 based on 15 critics, indicating "universal acclaim".

References

External links
 
 

2017 British television series debuts
2017 British television series endings
2010s British drama television series
BBC television dramas
E. M. Forster in performing arts
2010s British television miniseries
English-language television shows
Starz original programming
Television series about sisters
Television series set in the 1900s